Andrés López de Noche (English: Andrés López by Night) was a Spanish language talk show which aired from 2012 to 2014 throughout Latin America on the channel OnDirecTV.

It was launched on November 1, 2012 by DirecTV Latin America. Every week López interviewed two Latin American celebrities. The show was not renewed after its third season in 2014.

Interviews 

Some of the guests that the show welcomed in the first season were: The Dominican singer-songwriter Wilfrido Vargas, the Cuban journalist and presenter Ismael Cala, Colombian singer Andrés Cepeda (singer), the Colombian singer Fanny Lu, the Puerto Rican singer and actor Carlos Ponce, the Peruvian singer and actress Stephanie Cayo, the Colombian John Paul Ospina, the Colombian group Chocquibtown, the Chilean singer-songwriter Alberto Plaza, the Colombian singer Jiggy Drama, the Colombian singer Santiago Cruz, the Colombian host Andrea Serna, the Ecuadorian actress Marisol Romero, the Venezuelan comedian Erika de la Vega, the Mexican chef José Ramón Castillo, the Argentine comedian Micky McPhantom, the Ecuadorian actress and presenter Erika Vélez, the Colombian actress Juanita Acosta, the Colombian model Catalina Maya, the Colombian actress Margarita Rosa de Francisco, the Colombian actress Maritza Rodríguez, the Venezuelan actress Johanna Morales, the entrepreneur and founder of Open English Andrés Moreno and the actor Adrián Lara, among others.  115   116 

In the second season of Andrés López de Noche that began broadcasting at the beginning of September 2013 were invited, the Banda Argentina Miranda!, The Venezuelan presenter Daniela Kosan, the Chilean band Los Búnkeres, the writer Colombian Ángela Becerra, Mexican actress Paola Nuñez, the Argentine singer-songwriter Coti, the Mexican band Kinky, the Spanish singer India Martínez, the Spanish musician Álex Ubago, Venezuelan Actor Juan Alfonso Baptista "Gato", the Puerto Rican singer Kany García, the Argentine musician Kevin Johansen, the Argentine actress Coki Ramírez, the Colombian Carlos Catano voice of ESPN Latin America, the Colombian Alex Pinilla official voice of NatGeo Latin America, the Colombian actress Lorna Cepeda, the Cuban singer Amaury Gutiérrez, the Argentine band Tan Biónica, the presenter and Venezuelan model Maité Delgado, the Chilean presenter and businesswoman Cecilia Bolocco, the ctor colombiano Andrés Parra, the actress and model Taliana Vargas, the Ecuadorian composer and singer Juan Fernando Velasco, the Argentine band Illya Kuryaki and the Valderramas, the Colombian journalist Juan Carlos Arciniegas, the Ecuadorian actor Roberto Manrique, the Chilean singer-songwriter Beto Cuevas.  117   118

Reach 
The program reached different Latin American countries como: Colombia, Ecuador, Peru, Venezuela, Argentina, Chile, Uruguay, Puerto Rico, Trinidad and Tobago, Aruba, Curaçao, Barbados.

References 

https://archive.org/details/ALDNCredits

2010s Colombian television series
2012 Colombian television series debuts
2014 Colombian television series endings
Colombian television talk shows